Opostega chalcophylla is a moth of the family Opostegidae. It was described by Edward Meyrick in 1910. It is known from Assam in India.

Adults have been recorded in September.

References

Opostegidae
Moths described in 1910